This is a list of notable automotive fuel retailers ("petrol" or "gasoline", "diesel", etc.) and their controlling oil companies.
The format of this page is based on current ownership and where they largely operate:

 Parent company
 Children (acquired companies and notable brands)

A 

 Access Fuels — Australia
Admiral Oil Co. — Michigan
 Akwa Group — Morocco
 Afriquia
 Aldrees — Saudi Arabia
 Alliance — Russia
 Allied Petroleum — Pakistan
 Allied Petroleum - New Zealand 
 Aloha Petroleum — Hawaii
 Alon — United States
 Amerika — South Florida, U.S.
 Amoco — United States
 Ampol — Australia
 Ampride — United States
 ANCAP — Uruguay
 Anonima Petroli Italiana — Italy
 APCO — Australia
 APCO — Midwest, U.S.
 Applegreen - Republic of Ireland, UK and the U.S.
 Asda — United Kingdom
 Askar Oil — Pakistan
 Atlantsolía — Iceland
 Attock Petroleum — Pakistan and Afghanistan
 Avia International — Pan-European
 Axion Energy — Argentina
 Azpetrol — Azerbaijan
 Al-Osais Petroleum — Saudi Arabia

B 

 Bapco — Bahrain
 Mumtaz
 Bates Oil — Ireland
 Best — Norway
 Bharat Petroleum — India
 BP (advertising tagline "Beyond Petroleum"; initials stood for British Petroleum, but with the merger of Amoco in 1998, BP is the actual corporate name)
 Amoco — United States, was used as a fuel grade until BP brought it back as a fuel brand in 2017
 Aral — Germany, Luxembourg

 Burmah — former gasoline brand used in the UK, Australia and Belgium
 Sohio — former gasoline brand, now used as a marine fuel brand in Ohio
 Buc-ee's – United States
Budget Petrol — Australia
 BWOC — UK
 By-Macken — Sweden

C 

 Canadian Tire Petroleum — Canada
 Cango Incorporated — small Canadian petroleum group, partners with Esso Imperial Oil
 Cepsa — Spanish Oil Retailer operating in multiple locations
 Certified — independent brand based in Columbus, Ohio, United States, selling fuel under the Certified brand; also sells fuel at select stations under the Marathon and Sunoco brands
 Cango
 Gas Rite
 Sunys
 Challenge — New Zealand
 Chevron — international
 Chevron — United States, Canada, and Mexico
 Caltex — Asia, Africa, New Zealand
 Texaco — Europe, United States and Latin America
 China National Petroleum Corporation — China
 PetroChina — China
CHS
Cenex — United States, mainly midwestern, western and southwest regions
 Circle K
 Ingo — Denmark and Sweden
 Citgo
 Clark; United States: now a licensed brand only
 Coastal — Panama; also owns Delta; Coastal name being phased out in most US States
 Combustia — Switzerland
 Conoco
 76 — former brand of Union Oil of California, which has exited the retail fuel business
 Conoco — southeast and central United States
 Jet — Europe and Thailand
 Phillips 66
 Supplied by Suncor Energy in Colorado
 ProJet — Malaysia, sold late 2007 to Shell
 Copec — Chile
 Cosan — Brazil; acquired Esso's Brazilian distribution business and is slowly phasing in its own brand
 Cosmo Oil — Japan
 Costco Gasoline — next to many Costco stores
 CountryMark — Indiana
 CPC Corporation — Taiwan
 Crevier — Canada
 Crystal Flash Petroleum — United States (Indiana)
 Cupet — Cuba

D 

 Delek — Israel
 Delta — Panama
 Deutsche Erdöl-Aktiengesellschaft (DEA) — Germany and neighboring countries; sold by RWE to Shell in 2001
 Din-X — Sweden
 Domo Gasoline — Western Canada
 Dor-Alon — Israel

E 

 Eastern Petrolum — Philippines
 EG3 — Argentina; Isaura, Astra and Puma merged in 1996 to create the brand
 EG Group - UK, France, Belgium, Netherlands, Luxembourg, Germany, Italy, Australia and the United States
 EG Australia — Australia; petrol supplied by Caltex Lubricants and fluids by Havoline
 Elton Oil — Senegal
 Emo — Ireland
 Eneos (Nippon Oil Corporation) — Japan and China
 Engen — South Africa
 Eni — Italian petrol company
 Agip
 formerly IP; essentially the Italian Shell outlets acquired in 1974, which were sold to API in 2005
 ExxonMobil
 Esso — Worldwide, mainly Europe and Asia
 Esso/Imperial Oil — Canada
 Exxon — United States
 Mobil — United States, Canada, Colombia, Australia, Egypt, Mexico, Nigeria and New Zealand, formerly in Hong Kong, Japan and Malaysia

F 

 Fabian Oil - New England
 Fast Lube — Pakistan
 Federated Co-operatives — western Canada
 Freedom Fuels — Australia
 Flying J — United States and Canada (now owned by Pilot)
 Flying V — Philippines
 Formosa Petrochemical — Republic of China (Taiwan)
 Beeline
 Frontier — United States

G 

 Galp Energy — energy company of Portugal, formerly known as Petrogal
 Galp
 Gas America — United States; Indiana and Ohio
 Gasoline Alley Services (G.A.S) — New Zealand
 Gas Land Petroleum, Inc. Northeast US
 Getty Petroleum Marketing Inc.
 Getty — eastern US
 Giant Eagle
 GetGo
 Giant Industries, Inc — southwestern United States
 Conoco (joint alliance to market the Conoco gasoline brand) — Arizona, New Mexico, Colorado and Utah
 Giant — Arizona, Colorado and New Mexico
 Mustang — Arizona, New Mexico, Colorado and Utah
 GS Caltex — South Korea and China
 Gulf Oil — Northeastern US (by Cumberland Farms); Puerto Rico; Mexico, UK, Netherlands, Belgium, Sweden, Madagascar (by independent licensees)
 Gull Industries — Pacific Northwest US
 Gull — Washington, Oregon
 Gull Petroleum — Western Australia
 Gull Petroleum — Western Australia, New Zealand (North Island)
 Peak Petroleum — Western Australia

H 

 Haahr Benzin — Denmark
 Hancock — eastern United States
 Hascol Petroleum — Pakistan
 Hele — Hawaii
 Hess Corporation
 Hess — United States
 Merit - Northeastern United States (defunct)
 Hi Tec Oil — Australia,  New Zealand
 Hindustan Petroleum — India
 Holiday Stationstores — midwestern and northwestern United States
Huck's Food & Fuel — Midwestern US
 Husky Energy — Canada
 Husky
 Mohawk
 Hyundai Oilbank — South Korea

I 

 Idemitsu — Japan
 Indian Oil Corporation — India, Sri Lanka, Mauritius, Middle East and other countries
 INSA Oil — Bulgaria
 Ipiranga — Brazil
 Irving Oil — Eastern Canada and New England
 Isaura — Argentina

J 

 JOMO — Japan

K 

 Kocolene Marketing — United States: Indiana, Ohio and Kentucky
 Fast Max convenience stores
 Kroger — sells under various brands throughout the United States in connection with their grocery and convenience stores such as Kroger, King Soopers, Turkey Hill and Loaf 'n Jug
 Kuwait Petroleum Corporation
 OKQ8 — Sweden, joint venture with OK
 Q8
 Kygnus Oil — Japan

L 

 Lanka — Sri Lanka
 La Gas - Mexico
 Liberty — United States
 Liberty Oil — Australia
 Liqui Moly — Germany
 Lotos — Poland
 Lukoil
 AKPET — Turkey
 Teboil — Finland

M 

 Marathon Petroleum
 Marathon
 Rich Oil
 Speedway
 Starvin' Marvin's — defunct
 ARCO

 Martin and Bayley
 Mariposa Oil- Texas
 Maverik Inc — Western US
 Maxol — Ireland
 Estuary
 McClure Oil Corporation — United States: Indiana
 Meijer — Michigan, Ohio, Indiana, Illinois, Kentucky
 Metro Petroleum — Australia
 Migrol — Switzerland
 Mitsubishi Energy Business Group — Japan
 MOL — Magyar Olaj és Gázipari Rt., Hungarian Oil in Hungary and Eastern Europe
 INA — Croatia
 Slovnaft — Slovakia
 Morrisons — United Kingdom
 Motul — France
 Murphy Oil
 Murco — United Kingdom
 MurphyUSA — United States, primarily at Wal-Mart locations
 Spur - United States

N 

 N1 — Iceland
 National Petroleum — Republic of China (Taiwan)
 National Petroleum - Trinidad and Tobago, West Indies
 Neste — Finland
 Nippon Oil — Japan
 North Atlantic Refining — Newfoundland, Canada
 NAFT — Saudi Arabia
 NPD - New Zealand

O 

 Oil and Gas Development Corporation (OGDC) — Pakistan
 OiLibya — UAE, Africa
 OK
 OKQ8 — Sweden, joint venture with Q8
 OK Benzin — Denmark
 Olco — Ontario and Quebec, Canada
 Olerex — Estonia
 Olís — Iceland
 OMV — Austria, Germany, Eastern Europe
 Avanti — Austria, discount brand
 Petrom — Romania
 Opet — Turkey
 Orkan Bensín — Iceland
 Oro Negro — Texas

P 

 Pacific Pride — United States
 Pakistan Burma Shell (PBS) — Pakistan
 Pakistan Oilfields — Pakistan
 Pakistan Refinery — Pakistan
 Pakistan Standard Oil — Pakistan
 Pakistan State Oil — Pakistan 
 Parkland Corporation — Canada
Chevron - under license
 Fas Gas Plus
 Pioneer Petroleum
 Ultramar
 Paz — Israel
 Pemex — Mexico
 Pertamina — Indonesia
 Petcom [now a subsidiary of Phoenix Fuels] — Jamaica
 Petro-Canada — Canada
 Petrobras — Brazil
 PetroChina — People's Republic of China
 Petrofina — Belgian company merged with Total in 1999
 Fina — United States
 Petrol Ofisi — Turkey
 Petróleos de Nicaragua — Nicaragua
 Petronic
 Petroleos de Venezuela
 Citgo — United States
 PDV — Venezuela
 Petróleos Mexicanos — Mexico
 Pemex
 Petron — Philippines
 Petronas — Malaysia
 Engen — South Africa
 Petronic — Nicaragua
 Phillips 66
 Phoenix — Philippines
 Pilot Corporation — United States
 Flying J — United States and Canada
 Pilot Flying J — United States
 PKN Orlen — Poland
 Benzina
 Orlen
 Orlen Lietuva — Lithuania
 Star - Germany
 UniPetrol
 Polly — United States
 Preem — Sweden
 Prista Oil — Bulgaria
 Prio Energy — Portugal
 Puma Energy — Singapore, Puerto Rico, Guatemala, Switzerland, South Africa, Puerto Rico
 Petromin — Jeddah, Saudi Arabia

Q 

 Q8 — Kuwait, Sweden, Denmark, Benelux, Italy
 Qstar — Sweden
 Bilisten — Sweden
 QuickChek — New Jersey, New York
 QuikStop — Western United States
 QuikTrip — Midwestern and Southern United States, Arizona

R 

 RaceTrac Petroleum — southeastern United States
 RaceTrac — company-owned stores
 RaceWay — franchised stores
 Red Barn (Gas Barn) — United States, Indiana, was part of Tire Barn, sold to Gas America
 Refinor — Argentina (only available in the provinces of Jujuy, Salta, Tucumán, Santiago del Estero and Córdoba)
 Reitangruppen
 Uno-X — Denmark and Norway
 YX Energi — Denmark and Norway, formerly known as Hydro Texaco
 Reliance Industries — India
 Repsol — Spain
 Rickers — United States — Indiana
 Rocket X Fuel —  midwest United States (now defunct), notable for red Xs on fencing surrounding the station
 Royal Farms — Maryland, Delaware, Pennsylvania, and Virginia
 Runes Bensin — Sweden
 Rutter's — Pennsylvania

S 

 S Group
 ABC — Finland
 Sainsbury's — United Kingdom
 Sasol — South Africa
 Saudi Aramco — Saudi Arabia
 S-Oil — South Korea
 Seaoil — Philippines
 7-Eleven
 Sheetz — Pennsylvania, Maryland, Ohio, West Virginia, Virginia, North Carolina
 Shell
 Motiva Enterprises — a joint venture with Saudi Aramco, sold under Shell brand
 Shell — international
 Shell V-Power — enhanced high specification fuel
 Shell Canada
 Shell — United States, BeNeLux
 Shell Australia — Australia
 Sinclair — Western and Central U.S.
 Singapore Petroleum Company (SPC) — Singapore
 Sinopec — China
 SK Energy — South Korea
 SK Gas — South Korea
 SOCAR
 A1 - Austria
 SOCAR - Azerbaijan, Georgia, Romania, Switzerland, Ukraine
 SOL PETROLEUM — Barbados
 Simpson Oil
 Solo Oil
 Sonol — Israel
 Speedway — United States
 Speedy Q — Michigan
 Spirit Petroleum — Pennsylvania
 St1 — Finland, Norway, Poland and Sweden
 Stork — Japan
 Sunoco — U.S. and Canada (separate ownership)
 SuperAmerica — Minnesota, Wisconsin, South Dakota
 SuperTest — Indiana
 Swifty — United States, primarily Indiana
 SASCO — Saudi Arabia

T 

 Tanka — Sweden, owned by Renault and Volvo dealers
 Terpel — Colombia
 Accel — Panama
 Tesco — United Kingdom, Ireland, Czech Republic, Poland, Slovakia and Hungary
 Tesco Momentum 99
 Tesoro — United States (acquired by Marathon Petroleum Company)
 ARCO
 Thrifty — California; formerly purchased by ARCO before BP takeover
 United Oil — California
 Shell (under license)
 Tesoro
 USA Gasoline
 Thorntons — Kentucky, Indiana, Illinois, Ohio, Tennessee, and Florida
 Tidewater Oil — under the name Tydol and Flying A, bought by Getty
 TinQ - Netherlands
 TOP — Ireland
 Topaz Energy — Ireland
 Shell (under license)
 Statoil (under license)
 Total — France, plus select countries in Europe, Latin America, Africa and Asia
 APCO — United States
 Elf
 Vickers — United States
 Tas'helat — Saudi Arabia
Tom Thumb
 TPPD — Turkey

U 

UniOil — Philippines
 United Petroleum — Australia
 United Refining
 Kwik Fill – New York, Pennsylvania, and Ohio

V 

 Valero — U.S.
 Beacon — U.S.
 Diamond Shamrock — U.S.
 Shamrock — U.S.
 Total — U.S.
 UK Fuels Brand — filling stations still in existence, though company now focuses on fuel cards

W 

 Wawa — Delaware, Pennsylvania, Maryland, Virginia, Florida and New Jersey
 Wilsons Gas Stops — Atlantic Canada
 WSCO Petroleum — Pacific Northwest US
 Astro — Washington, Oregon
 WDTV — Colorado
 WDTVS Fuel Xpress (sister of WDTv)
 Wafi Energy — Saudi Arabia

Y 

 YPF — Argentina, Uruguay and Chile

Z 

 Z Energy — New Zealand
 Zenex — South Africa
 Zephyr — United States (Midwest)
 Ziz — Morocco

External links 

 The Gas Signs website shows images of many brands of gasoline on service stations, mainly in the US.
 The Petrol Maps website provides a comprehensive list of European brands known to have issued road maps, as well as a summary of some of the larger names not thought to have sold maps.

Notes and references 

 
automotive fuel